St Michael's/Foilmore is a Gaelic Athletic Association football club from South Kerry in County Kerry, Ireland.

Roll of honour

 All-Ireland Intermediate Club Football Championship (1) 2009
 Munster Intermediate Club Football Championship: (1) 2008
 South Kerry Senior Football Championship: (4) 2007, 2008, 2012, 2013
 South Kerry Senior Football League: (7) 2003, 2007, 2008, 2009, 2010, 2012, 2022
 Kerry Intermediate Football Championship (1)  2008
 Kerry Junior Football Championship (1) 2001
 Munster Junior Club Football Championship: (1) 2001
 Kerry Novice Football Championship (1) 1998
 Kerry County League Division 2: (1) 2007
 Kerry County League Division 4: (2) 1995, 2001
 Kerry County League Division 5:  (2) 1994, 2022

Former Kerry Senior players
 Mark Griffin - 2013 - 2019
 Adrian O'Connell - 2006 - 2011
 Ronan O'Connor - 2002 - 2006
 James O'Shea - 1996 - 1999
 Jerry O'Sullivan - 1983 - 1986

All-Ireland winners

All-Ireland Senior Football Championship

 Mark Griffin (1): 2014
 Adrian O'Connell (1): 2006
 Ronan O'Connor (2): 2004, 2006

All-Ireland Under 21 Football Championship

 James O'Shea (2): 1995, 1996

All-Ireland Minor Football Championship

 James O'Shea (1): 1994

All-Ireland Vocational Schools

 James O'Shea (1): 1993

Hogan Cup

 Max Thiemann (1): 2009
 Mark Griffin (1): 2009
 Damien Kelly (1): 2009
 Eanna O'Connor (1): 2009

County League

References

Gaelic games clubs in County Kerry
Gaelic football clubs in County Kerry